Bergqvist, Bergquist, Berquist and Bergkvist are surnames of Swedish origin which may refer to:

Bergqvist
Åke Bergqvist  (1900–1975), Swedish sailor who competed in the 1932 Summer Olympics 
Allan Bergkvist (1908–1985), Swedish chess master
Erik Bergqvist  (1891–1954), Swedish water polo player and freestyle swimmer 
Jonas Bergqvist, Swedish retired ice hockey right winger 
Kajsa Bergqvist,  Swedish former high jumper
Kjell Bergqvist, Swedish actor 
Maj-Britt Bergqvist, Swedish sprint canoer who competed in the late 1930s.
Nils Bergkvist, (1900-unknown), Swedish chess master
Olof Bergqvist (1862–1940), Swedish bishop
Sven Bergqvist (1914–1996), Swedish bandy, ice hockey and football player.

Bergquist
Patricia Bergquist  (1933–2009), New Zealand biologist and zoologist
Thorwald Bergquist (1899–1972), Swedish politician
Ulrika Bergquist (born 1969), Swedish journalist and television presenter

Berquist
Emily Berquist, American historian
Henry J. Berquist (1905-1990), American politician
Joy Berquist (1901-1942), American football player, lawyer, and judge
Marcus Berquist (1934-2010), American philosopher and professor
Matt Berquist (born 1983), New Zealand rugby union player

Bergkvist
Per-Ragnar Bergkvist, Swedish ice hockey player

Swedish-language surnames